Burkburnett is a city in Wichita County, Texas, United States. It is part of the Wichita Falls, Texas metropolitan statistical area. Its population was 10,811 at the 2010 census. The community newspaper, the Burkburnett Informer/Star, is published each Thursday.

History
Originally settled by ranchers as early as 1856, this community was known by some locals as Nesterville. By 1880, the town had a small store with a population of 132. From 1882 until 1903, a post office operated there under the designation Gilbert, named after the North Texas pioneer Mabel Gilbert. In 1906, a nearby wealthy rancher named Samuel Burk Burnett sold more than 16,000 acres (65 km) of his land in northern Wichita County to a group of investors who were seeking to extend into the wheat-growing area of Western Oklahoma the Wichita Falls and Northwestern Railway, one of the Frank Kell/Joseph A. Kemp properties based in Wichita Falls.

Within Burnett's former land near the railroad, lots were auctioned off the following year and a post office was established. The town was named Burkburnett by U.S. President Theodore Roosevelt, who visited the area for a wolf hunt that was hosted by the wealthy rancher Burnett. In 1912, oil was discovered west of the town, attracting thousands to the area, and by 1918, about 20,000 people had settled around the oilfield. This part of the town's history was chronicled in the film, Boom Town with Clark Gable and Spencer Tracy. The Great Depression had a negative impact on the town's population, which was boosted again in 1941 as Sheppard Air Force Base was established nearby.

Geography
According to the United States Census Bureau, Burkburnett has a total area of 9.5 square miles (24.6 km), all of it land.

Climate
The climate in this area is characterized by hot, humid summers and generally mild to cool winters. According to the Köppen climate classification, Burkburnett has a humid subtropical climate, Cfa on climate maps.

Demographics

2020 census

As of the 2020 United States census, there were 10,939 people, 4,725 households, and 3,330 families residing in the city.

2000 census
As of the census of 2000, 10,445 people, 4,139 households, and 3,108 families resided in the city. The population density was 1,149.5 people per square mile (443.6/km). The 4,449 housing units averaged 468.0 per square mile (180.6/km). The racial makeup of the city was 90.67% White, 2.88% African American, 1.06% Native American, 0.64% Asian, 0.07% Pacific Islander, 2.66% from other races, and 2.00% from two or more races. Hispanics or Latinos of any race were 6.20% of the population.

Of the 4,139 households, 36.7% had children under the age of 18 living with them, 60.5% were married couples living together, 11.3% had a female householder with no husband present, and 24.9% were not families. About 22.3% of all households were made up of individuals, and 10.1% had someone living alone who was 65 years of age or older. The average household size was 2.62, and the average family size was 3.05.

In the city, the population was distributed as 27.9% under the age of 18, 7.8% from 18 to 24, 28.3% from 25 to 44, 22.2% from 45 to 64, and 13.8% who were 65 years of age or older. The median age was 37 years. For every 100 females, there were 93.6 males. For every 100 females age 18 and over, there were 88.6 males.

The median income for a household in the city was $37,408, and for a family was $42,917. Males had a median income of $31,720 versus $21,977 for females. The per capita income for the city was $17,507. About 7.9% of families and 9.5% of the population were below the poverty line, including 13.0% of those under age 18 and 8.9% of those age 65 or over.

Government
The city of Burkburnett is a home-rule municipality. The governing body is composed of seven city commissioners who are elected by the voters at-large, rather than by district. The commissioners serve staggered, two-year terms, with four elected during even-numbered years and three elected during odd-numbered years.  The commissioners are charged with electing the mayor from among the city commissioners, and appointing or reappointing the city manager. The mayor is the traditional public figurehead of the city, while the city manager is responsible for the day-to-day operations within the city government.

Education

The City of Burkburnett is served by the Burkburnett Independent School District. The school district operates three elementary schools: I.C. Evans Elementary, John G. Tower Elementary, and Overton Ray Elementary, Burkburnett Middle School, and Burkburnett High School. I.C. Evans houses the Burkburnett Head Start program. John G. Tower is located in Wichita Falls, minutes from Sheppard AFB. The mascot for all Burkburnett schools is Bulldogs.

Notable people

 Nolan Miller, Fashion designer; was born in Burkburnett in 1933

References

External links

 City of Burkburnett
 Burkburnett Chamber of Commerce

Cities in Texas
Cities in Wichita County, Texas
Wichita Falls metropolitan area
1923 establishments in Texas